Oana Caruana Pulpan (born 17 April 1978) is a Maltese chess player. She was the Woman FIDE Master in 2009. She is a member of the Maltese Women's National Team. Her father introduced her to chess when she was very young and has been playing it since.

She is sponsored by the company she works with, Actavis. She is also a pharmacologist. She teaches chess classes at St. Catherine's High School in Pembroke, Malta.

References 

1978 births
Living people
Chess Woman FIDE Masters